Messrs. Roberts Brothers (1857–1898) were bookbinders and publishers in 19th-century Boston, Massachusetts. Established in 1857 by Austin J. Roberts, John F. Roberts, and Lewis A. Roberts, the firm began publishing around the early 1860s. American authors included: Louisa May Alcott, Susan Coolidge, Emily Dickinson, Maud Howe Elliott, Louise Imogen Guiney, Julia Ward Howe, Helen Hunt Jackson, Abigail May Alcott Nieriker. British and European authors included: Berthold Auerbach, Caroline Bauer,  Mathilde Blind,  Juliana Horatia Ewing, Anne Gilchrist, David Gray, Philip Gilbert Hamerton, Jean Ingelow, Vernon Lee, William Morris, Silvio Pellico, Adelaide Ristori, A. Mary F. Robinson, George Sand, Charlotte Mary Yonge, Helen Zimmern.

History

The Roberts Brothers were "bookbinders" from 1857 until 1862 (offices successively at: 120 Washington St.; Temple Place; 149 Washington St.) Beginning in 1862 they were also makers of "photograph albums." In 1863 Thomas Niles, Jr. began working at the firm. He became partner some years thereafter and remained with the Roberts Brothers until his death in 1894. By 1873 the firm was listed under the names of just Lewis Roberts and Thomas Niles. After several decades on Washington Street across from Old South Meeting House, the business moved to Somerset Street in the 1880s.

As publishers, the Roberts Brothers made their name in 1868 with the publication of Louisa May Alcott's Little Women, a best-seller. It featured illustrations by Alcott's sister, May Alcott, who also appeared as a character (Amy) in the book.

From 1876–1887, the firm issued a "No Name Series" of books that did not reveal the writers' names in an attempt to allow the writing to stand on its own merits rather than the reputation of the authors. The books were the brainchild of Thomas Niles, Jr., a partner at Roberts Brothers. Harper's praised the move, writing "The idea is a good one, not only because it will pique the curiosity of the reader, but also because it will put the writers on their mettle to do their best, and absolutely prevent that trading on reputation which is the greatest vice of American litterateurs."

The Famous Women Series of the 1880s and 1890s consisted of biographies of Margaret Fuller, Jane Austen, Mary Wollstonecraft, George Eliot, and others, most of them written by women. As a contemporary review put it, "subjects and authors are in the main English, but several famous American women have had their trials and triumphs recorded by other famous American women."

Little, Brown bought the firm in 1898.

Further reading

Works published by the firm
 David Gray. Poems. 1865.
 Shakespeare. The works of William Shakespeare. 1866.
 Philip Gilbert Hamerton. Painter's Camp. 1867.
 Jean Ingelow. A story of doom: and other poems. 1867.
 Berthold Auerbach. On the heights. 1868.
 Silvio Pellico. My Prisons: Memoirs. 1868.
 F.C. Burnand. Happy Thoughts. 1869.
 George Sand. Antonia. v.2, 1870.
 George Parsons Lathrop (editor), A Masque of Poets, 1878
 Abigail May Alcott Nieriker. Studying art abroad, and how to do it cheaply. 1879.
 Julia Ward Howe. Modern Society. 1881.
 Maud Howe Elliott. Newport Aquarelle. 1883.
 Memoirs of Karoline Bauer. 1885.
 Louise Imogen Guiney. Goose-Quill Papers. 1885.
 Balzac. Cousin Bette. 1888.
 Mary Prudence Wells Smith. Their canoe trip. 1889.
 George Sand. Mauprat. 1890.
 William Morris. The earthly paradise: a poem. 1893.
 Fyodor Dostoyevsky. Poor folk. 1894.

Famous Women Series
 Anne Gilchrist. Mary Lamb. 1883.
 Julia Ward Howe. Margaret Fuller (Marchesa Ossoli). 1883
 Bertha Thomas. George Sand. 1883.
 Elizabeth Robins Pennell. Life of Mary Wollstonecraft. 1884.
 Helen Zimmern. Maria Edgeworth. 1884.
 Mathilde Blind. George Eliot. 1885.
 Vernon Lee. Countess of Albany. 1885.
 Mrs. F. Fenwick Miller. Harriet Martineau. 1885.
 Mathilde Blind. Madame Roland. 1886.
 Eliza Clarke. Susanna Wesley. 1886.
 A. Mary F. Robinson. Emily Bronte. 1886.
 Bella Duffy. Madame de Stael. 1887.
 Nina A. Kennard. Mrs. Siddons. 1887.
 Caroline Healey Dall. The Life of Dr. Anandabai Joshee. 1888.
 John H. Ingram. Elizabeth Barrett Browning. 1888.
 Adelaide Ristori. Studies and memoirs: an autobiography. 1888.
 Mrs. Bradley Gilman. Saint Theresa of Avila. 1889.
 Charlotte M. Yonge. Hannah More. 1890.
 Nina H. Kennard. Rachel. 1895.
 Mrs. Charles Malden. Jane Austen. 1896.

Children's books
 Louisa May Alcott. Little Women. 1868.
 Louisa May Alcott. An Old-Fashioned Girl. 1870. Engravings by W.H. Morse.
 
 R.L. Stevenson. Treasure Island. 1884.
 Susan Coolidge. Nine Little Goslings. 1893.
 Juliana Horatia Gatty Ewing. Story of a Short Life. 1893.
 Helen Jackson. Ramona. 1896.

Works about the firm
 Book-making at the Hub; Boston's old and new publishers and their work. New York Times, September 10, 1881.
 Raymond L. Kilgour. Messrs. Roberts Brothers Publishers. 1952.
 Joel Myerson. "Roberts Brothers." Publishers for mass entertainment in 19th century America. 1980; p. 267-276.
 "Thomas Niles, Jr." Louisa May Alcott encyclopedia. Greenwood Pr., 2001; p. 233-234.
 "Roberts Brothers." Louisa May Alcott encyclopedia. Greenwood Pr., 2001; p. 287.

References

External links

 WorldCat
 Houghton Library, Harvard Univ. Roberts Brothers (Boston, Mass.). Roberts Brothers (Boston, Mass.) letters to Louisa May Alcott: Guide.

Defunct publishing companies of the United States
Businesspeople from Boston
Financial District, Boston
19th century in Boston
Publishing companies established in 1857
1857 births
1898 deaths
1857 establishments in Massachusetts
American companies established in 1857
19th-century American businesspeople